Hilde Sherman (a.k.a. Hilde Sherman-Zander; 1923–2011) was a German Holocaust survivor and memoirist. During World War II, she was deported to the Riga Ghetto in December 1941 by the Nazis. She later emigrated to Colombia. She published her memoir, Entre luz y tinieblas and Zwischen Tag und Dunkel : Mädchenjahre im Ghetto, in 1982 and 1984. She also spoke to Yad Vashem about her ordeal. She retired in Jerusalem, Israel, where she died in 2011.

Works 
 Entre luz y tinieblas, Cali 1982, 
 Zwischen Tag und Dunkel, Mädchenjahre im Ghetto, Frankfurt am Main 1984,

References

External links
Yad Vashem: Teaching about Nazi Perpetrators

1923 births
2011 deaths
20th-century German Jews
Riga Ghetto inmates
German memoirists
German emigrants to Colombia
German emigrants to Israel
People from Jerusalem
Women memoirists
20th-century German women writers